The Dawn of Everything: A New History of Humanity is a 2021 book by anthropologist and anarchist activist David Graeber, and archaeologist David Wengrow. It was first published in the United Kingdom on 19 October 2021 by Allen Lane (an imprint of Penguin Books).

Graeber and Wengrow finished the book around August 2020. Its American edition is 704 pages long, including a 63-page bibliography. It was a finalist for the Orwell Prize for Political Writing (2022).

Describing the diversity of early human societies, the book critiques traditional narratives of history's linear development from primitivism to civilization. Instead, The Dawn of Everything posits that humans lived in large, complex, but decentralized polities for millennia. It relies on archaeological evidence to show that early societies were diverse and developed numerous political structures.

The Dawn of Everything was widely reviewed in the popular press and in leading academic journals, as well as in activist circles, with divided opinions being expressed across the board. Both favorable and critical reviewers noted its challenge to existing paradigms in the study of human history.

Summary 
The authors open the book by suggesting that current popular views on the progress of western civilization, as presented by Francis Fukuyama, Jared Diamond, Steven Pinker and Yuval Noah Harari, are not supported by anthropological or archaeological evidence, but owe more to philosophical dogmas inherited unthinkingly from the Age of Enlightenment. The authors refute the Hobbesian and Rousseauian view on the origin of the social contract, stating that there is no single original form of human society. Moreover, they argue that the transition from foraging to agriculture was not a civilization trap that laid the ground for social inequality, and that throughout history, large-scale societies have often developed in the absence of ruling elites and top-down systems of management.

Rejecting the "origins of inequality" as a framework for understanding human history, the authors consider where this question originated, and find the answers in a series of encounters between European settlers and the Indigenous populations of North America. They argue that the latter provided a powerful counter-model to European civilisation and a sustained critique of its hierarchy, patriarchy, punitive law, and profit-motivated behaviour, which entered European thinking in the 18th century through travellers accounts and missionary relations, to be widely imitated by the thinkers of the Enlightenment. They illustrate this process through the historical example of the Wendat leader Kondiaronk, and his depiction in the best-selling works of the Baron Lahontan, who had spent ten years in the colonies of New France. The authors further argue that the standard narrative of social evolution, including the framing of history as modes of production and a progression from hunter-gatherer to farmer to commercial civilisation, originated partly as a way of silencing this Indigenous critique, and recasting human freedoms as naive or primitive features of social development.

Subsequent chapters develop these initial claims with archaeological and anthropological evidence. The authors describe ancient and modern communities that self-consciously abandoned agricultural living, employed seasonal political regimes (switching back and forth between authoritarian and communal systems), and constructed urban infrastructure with egalitarian social programs. The authors then present extensive evidence for the diversity and complexity of political life among non-agricultural societies on different continents, from Japan to the Americas, including cases of monumental architecture, slavery, and the self-conscious rejection of slavery through a process of cultural schismogenesis. They then examine archaeological evidence for processes that eventually led to the adoption and spread of agriculture, concluding that there was no Agricultural Revolution, but a process of slow change, taking thousands of years to unfold on each of the world's continents, and sometimes ending in demographic collapse (e.g. in prehistoric Europe). They conclude that ecological flexibility and sustained biodiversity were key to the successful establishment and spread of early agriculture.

The authors then go on to explore the issue of scale in human history, with archaeological case studies from early China, Mesoamerica, Europe (Ukraine), the Middle East, South Asia, and Africa (Egypt). They conclude that contrary to standard accounts, the concentration of people in urban settlements did not lead mechanistically to the loss of social freedoms or the rise of ruling elites. While acknowledging that in some cases, social stratification was a defining feature of urban life from the beginning, they also document cases of early cities that present little or no evidence of social hierarchies, lacking such elements as temples, palaces, central storage facilities, or written administration, as well as examples of cities like Teotihuacan, that began as hierarchical settlements, but reversed course to follow more egalitarian trajectories, providing high quality housing for the majority of citizens. They also discuss at some length the case of Tlaxcala as an example of Indigenous urban democracy in the Americas, before the arrival of Europeans, and the existence of democratic institutions such as municipal councils and popular assemblies in ancient Mesopotamia.

Synthesizing these findings, the authors move to discovering underlying factors for the rigid, hierarchical, and highly bureaucratized political system of contemporary civilization. Rejecting the category of "the State" as a trans-historical reality, they instead define three basic sources of domination in human societies: control over violence (sovereignty), control over information (bureaucracy), and charismatic competition (politics). They explore the utility of this new approach by comparing examples of early centralised societies that elude definition as states, such as the Olmec and Chavín de Huántar, as well as the Inca, China in the Shang dynasty, the Maya Civilization, and Ancient Egypt. From this they go on to argue that these civilisations were not direct precursors to our modern states, but operated on very different principles. The origins of modern states, they conclude, are shallow rather than deep, and owe more to colonial violence than to social evolution. Returning to North America, the authors then bring the story of the Indigenous critique and Kondiaronk full circle, showing how the values of freedom and democracy encountered by Europeans among the Wendat and neighbouring peoples had historical roots in the rejection of an earlier system of hierarchy, with its focus at the urban center of Cahokia on the Mississippi.

Based on their accumulated discussions, the authors conclude by proposing a reframing of the central questions of human history. Instead of the origins of inequality, they suggest that our central dilemma is the question of how modern societies have lost the qualities of flexibility and political creativity that were once more common. They ask how we have apparently "got stuck" on a single trajectory of development, and how violence and domination became normalised within this dominant system. Without offering definitive answers, the authors end the book by suggesting lines of further investigation. These focus on the loss of three basic forms of social freedom, which they argue were once common: the freedom to escape one's surroundings and move away, the freedom to disobey arbitrary authority, and the freedom to reimagine and reconstruct one's society in a different form. They emphasise the loss of women's autonomy, and the insertion of principles of violence into basic notions of social care at the level of domestic and family relations, as crucial factors in establishing more rigid political systems. The book ends by suggesting that received narratives of social development are largely myths, and that possibilities for social emancipation can be found in a more accurate understanding of human history, based on scientific evidence that has come to light only in the last few decades.

Reception 

The book entered The New York Times best-seller list at No. 2 for the week of November 28, 2021, while its German translation entered Der Spiegel Bestseller list at No.1. It was named a Sunday Times, Observer and BBC History Book of the Year. The book was shortlisted for the Orwell Prize for Political Writing. Historian David Edgerton, who chaired the judges panel, praised the book, saying it "genuinely is a new history of humanity" and a "celebration of human freedom and possibility, based on a reexamination of prehistory, opening up the past to make new futures possible.”  Writing for The Hindu, G. Sampath noted that two strands run through the book: "the consolidation of a corpus of archaeological evidence, and a history of ideas." Inspired by "the rediscovery of an unknown past," he asks, "can humanity imagine a future that's more worthy of itself?"

Gideon Lewis-Kraus said in The New Yorker that the book "aspires to enlarge our political imagination by revitalizing the possibilities of the distant past". In The Atlantic, William Deresiewicz described the book as "brilliant" and "inspiring", stating that it "upends bedrock assumptions about 30,000 years of change." The anthropologist Giulio Ongaro, stated in Jacobin and Tribune that "Graeber and Wengrow do to human history what [Galileo and Darwin] did to astronomy and biology respectively". In Bookforum, Michael Robbins called the book both "maddening" and "wonderful." Historian of science Emily Kern, writing in the Boston Review, called the book "erudite" and "funny", suggesting that "once you start thinking like Graeber and Wengrow, it's difficult to stop." Andrew Anthony in The Observer said the authors persuasively replace "the idea of humanity being forced along through evolutionary stages with a picture of prehistoric communities making their own conscious decisions of how to live".

Historian David Priestland argued in The Guardian that Peter Kropotkin had more powerfully addressed the sorts of questions that a persuasive case for modern-day anarchism should address, but lauded the authors' historical "myth-busting" and called it "an exhilarating read". Philosopher Kwame Anthony Appiah argued in The New York Review of Books that there is a "discordance between what the book says and what its sources say," while also stating that the book, which is "chockablock with archaeological and ethnographic minutiae, is an oddly gripping read". NYRB subsequently published an extended exchange between Wengrow and Appiah under the title "The Roots of Inequality" in which Wengrow expanded on the book's use of archaeological sources, while Appiah concluded that "Graeber and Wengrow's argument against historical determinism—against the alluring notion that what happened had to have happened—is itself immensely valuable." Another philosopher, Helen De Cruz, wrote that the book offers "a valuable exercise in philosophical genealogy by digging up the origins of our political and social dysfunction," but also criticised the book for neglecting a range of other possible methodologies. 

Writing in the Chicago Review, historian Brad Bolman and archaeologist Hannah Moots suggest that what makes the book so important is "its attempt to make accessible a vast array of recent anthropological and archaeological evidence; to read it against the grain; and to synthesize those findings into a novel story about what exactly happened in our long past," drawing comparisons with the work of V. Gordon Childe. Reviewing for American Antiquity archaeologist Jennifer Birch called the book 'a resounding success', while archaeologist and anthropologist Rosemary Joyce, reviewing for American Anthropologist, wrote that the book succeeds in providing "provocative thinking about major questions of human history" and a "convincing demonstration of new frameworks of anthropological comparison". 

Archaeologist Mike Pitts, reviewing for British Archaeology described the book as "glorious" and suggested that its joint authorship by an anthropologist and an archaeologist "gives the book a depth and rigour rarely seen in the genre". Reviewing for Scientific American, John Horgan described the book as "both a dense, 692-page scholarly inquiry into the origins of civilization and an exhilarating vision of human possibility" 

In Anthropology Today, Arjun Appadurai accused the book of "swerving to avoid a host of counter-examples and counter-arguments" while also describing the book's "fable" as "compelling". David Wengrow responded in the same issue. Anthropology Today later published a letter to the editor, in which political ecologist Jens Friis Lund writes "Appadurai never discloses where and how exactly Graeber and Wengrow go wrong," calling the book a "monumental empirical effort" and "exemplar of interdisciplinary engagement." In a subsequent issue, Anthropology Today published a full review of the book by social anthropologist Luiz Costa, who suggested it contains "a range of examples of societies drawing on their own past experiences, or those of neighbouring peoples, to shape future ways of life - not in a voluntaristic sense, but within specific social patterns, considering historical events." Costa compared The Dawn of Everything to classic works by Claude Lévi-Strauss in terms of its scope and importance. Another anthropologist Thomas Hylland Eriksen called the book an "intellectual feast"   

The historian David A. Bell, responding solely to Graeber and Wengrow's arguments about the Indigenous origins of Enlightenment thought and Jean-Jacques Rousseau, accused the authors of coming "perilously close to scholarly malpractice." Historian and philosopher Justin E. H. Smith suggested "Graeber and Wengrow are to be credited for helping to re-legitimise this necessary component of historical anthropology, which for better or worse is born out of the history of the missions and early modern global commerce." 

Anthropologist Durba Chattaraj claimed that the book includes "elisions, slippages, and too-exaggerated leaps" when referring to archaeology from India, but stated that its authors are "extremely rigorous and meticulous scholars", and that reading the book from India "expands our worlds and allows us to step outside of a particular postcolonial predicament." Anthropologist Matthew Porges, writing in The Los Angeles Review of Books suggested the book is "provocative, if not necessarily comprehensive", and that its "great value is that it provides a much better point of departure for future explorations of what was actually happening in the past". Anthropologist Richard Handler claimed that the book's endnotes "often reveal that a particularly startling interpretation of archaeological evidence depends on one or two sources taken from vast bodies of literature" while also claiming that the stories told "are stories we need and want to hear."

Writing for the New York Journal of Books, another anthropologist, James H. McDonald, suggested that The Dawn of Everything "may well prove to be the most important book of the decade, for it explodes deeply held myths about the inevitability of our social lives dominated by the state". Anthropologist James Suzman in the Literary Review claimed that the book doesn't "engage with the vast historical and academic literature on recent African ... small scale hunter-gatherers", but also maintained that the book is "consistently thought-provoking" in "forcing us to re-examine some of the cosy assumptions about our deep past". Writing for Black Perspectives Kevin Suemnicht noted that the book develops ideas proposed by Orlando Patterson to account for the loss of human freedoms, and argued that the book confirms the "Fanonian positions within the Black Radical Tradition that this world-system is inherently anti-Black". In Antiquity, archaeologist Rachael Kiddey suggested that the book arose from "playful conversations between two eminently qualified friends" and also that it contributes to "feminist revisions of the development of knowledge."

In Cliodynamics various authors praised the book while also making criticisms. Gary M. Feinman accused Graeber and Wengrow of using "cherry-picked and selectively presented examples". Another archaeologist Michael E. Smith criticized the book for "problems of evidence and argumentation". Ian Morris claimed some of the book's arguments "run more on rhetoric than on method," but praised it as "a work of careful research and tremendous originality." Historian Walter Scheidel criticized the book for its lack of "materialist perspectives", but also called it "timely and stimulating".  

The book's reception among the political left was polarizing. Several reviewers suggested that the book was written from an anarchist perspective. Sébastien Doubinsky called the book "an important work, both as a summary of recent discoveries in the fields of archaeology and anthropology and as an eye-opener on the structures of dominant narratives". In Cosmonaut Magazine, Nicolas Villarreal described the book as "a series of brilliant interventions" while criticising the authors for not appreciating that ideology and politics are "the source of our profound unfreedom." CJ Sheu said the book is "simply put a masterpiece" while Peter Isackson in Fair Observer described the book as "nothing less than a compelling invitation to reframe and radically rethink our shared understanding of humanity's history and prehistory." Eliza Delay, writing for Resilience called the book "a revelation" and a "sweeping revision of how we see ourselves." Socialist activist and anthropologist Chris Knight stated that the "core message" of the book was rejecting Engels' primitive communism, and called The Dawn of Everything "incoherent and wrong" for beginning "far too late" and "systematically side-stepping the cultural flowering that began in Africa tens of thousands of years before Homo sapiens arrived in Europe". In a longer review, Knight did, however, emphasize that the book's "one important point" was "its advocacy of [political] oscillation". 

Reviewers in the Ecologist expressed the view that the authors "fail to engage with the enormous body of new scholarship on human evolution" while, at the same time, calling the book a "howling wind of fresh air". Reviewing for The Rumpus Beau Lee Gambold calls the book "at once dense, funny, thorough, joyful, unabashedly intelligent, and infinitely readable." Historian Ryne Clos claimed that the book partly relies on "a specious, exaggerated interpretation of the historical evidence" but that it is also "incredibly informative".
Historian Dominic Alexander, writing for socialist organization Counterfire questioned the evidence used in the book and characterized its rejection of "the teleological habit of thought" as a "profoundly debilitating approach" to political change. Market anarchist Charles Johnson noted the book's "idiosyncratic readings of sources". In The Nation, historian Daniel Immerwahr characterised the book as "less a biography of the species than a scrapbook, filled with accounts of different societies doing different things," while praising its refusal "to dismiss long-ago peoples as corks floating on the waves of prehistory. Instead, it treats them as reflective political thinkers from whom we might learn something".

Writing for Artforum, Simon Wu called the book a "bracing rewrite of human history". Bryan Appleyard in his review for The Sunday Times called it "pacey and potentially revolutionary." Reviewing for Science, Erle Ellis described The Dawn of Everything as "a great book that will stimulate discussions, change minds, and drive new lines of research".

References

External links 

 

2021 non-fiction books
Books by David Graeber
English-language books
History books
Anthropology books
Archaeology books
History books about civilization
Works about the theory of history
Allen Lane (imprint) books